Falkon is a web browser

Falkon may also refer to:
 Lee Falkon,  Israeli football player 
Falkon (convention), Polish science fiction convention
Falkon, a recurring character from Lords of the Ultra-Realm comic book series